Pandemonic Incantations is the third studio album by Polish extreme metal band Behemoth. The album was recorded during August and September 1997, at Selani Studio and was mixed in October 1997. The album was then released in 1998 by Solistitium Records, whilst Behemoth were still in their period of transition from black metal to blackened death metal. A remastered digipak version was released by Metal Mind Records with six bonus tracks, including five live tracks recorded during the European tour in Toulouse, France, on 27 February 1999 and a studio version of With Spell of Inferno (Mefisto).

It is known that on the original version of the album, the eighth track is followed by 57 tracks of silence. The outro is on track number 66.

Track listing

Personnel

Release history

References

Behemoth (band) albums
1998 albums
Albums produced by Adam Darski